Instant Tax Service was, until a federal court ordered its closure as part of a fraud lawsuit, based out of Dayton, Ohio, and specialized in tax preparation, electronic filing, and refund anticipation loan services.

Founded in 2000 by Fesum Ogbazion, the company was the second venture for Ogbazion, who cut his teeth in the tax industry with the founding of Instant Refund Tax Service in Cincinnati, OH in 1994. Ogbazion sold Instant Refund Tax Service to Fortune 500 giant Jackson Hewitt in 1999 and used the proceeds from the sale to start Instant Tax Service.

In 2009, Instant Tax Service was ranked #93 on the nation's top 500 fastest growing companies list by Inc. Magazine. The company also ranked #1 on Entrepreneur Magazine's Top New Franchises list and the #1 lowest cost franchise in the United States in 2009.

Federal courts later ordered the closure of Instant Tax Service after prosecutors sought an injunction, alleging fraud.

History 

Fesum Berhane Ogbazion, who came to the United States with his family in 1982 from Ethiopia, opened his first tax office in 1994, Instant Refund Tax Service, while pursuing a degree in accounting and finance at the University of Cincinnati. He strategically chose a former H&R Block tax office located just down the street from his parents’ home. The office was just 400 sq. ft. He prepared over 600 tax returns his first year, but barely broke even. However, over the next five years, Ogbazion's business prospered. He opened 26 additional locations throughout the Cincinnati, Ohio and Northern Kentucky area.

In 1999, sensing a major competitor in the area, Jackson Hewitt offered to buy Instant Refund Tax Service from Ogbazion for a reported $3 million. In the year 2000 and in accordance with his non-compete agreement, Ogbazion moved to Dayton, OH and rebuilt his business from the ground up.  Instant Tax Service began franchising in 2004.

Controversies 
On August 25, 2015, a federal grand jury in Dayton, OH, indicted for conspiracy and tax-related crimes, Fesum Ogbazion, of Beavercreek, Ohio, and Kyle Wade, formerly of West Chester, Ohio, were indicted on one count of impeding the administration of the Internal Revenue Code, one count of conspiracy to commit wire fraud and five counts of wire fraud.  Ogbazion is also charged with six counts of money laundering, one count of evasion of payment of employment taxes, eight counts of failure to collect and pay over employment taxes and one count of bank fraud.

On April 20, 2007, the Internal Revenue Service investigated allegations of fraud involving eight franchise-owned Instant Tax Service locations in Missouri. Though no charges were made, and no decision reached, Instant Tax Service terminated its contract with the franchisee saying the franchisee had expanded its business too quickly. The company no longer permits franchisees to operate more than a pre-determined number of storefronts during their first and second year.

In June 2010, the Internal Revenue Service returned all property and files to the Missouri franchisee with no further action taken.

A federal court preliminarily enjoined ITS Financial LLC, the parent company that owns Instant Tax Service At the time, ITS claimed to be the fourth-largest tax-preparation firm in the nation, according to the government complaint in the civil lawsuit. Judge Timothy Black of the U.S. District Court for the Southern District of Ohio signed the order, which also applies to the company’s CEO, Fesum Ogbazion. The defendants consented to the preliminary injunction.
 
The preliminary injunction will remain in force pending the court’s decision following trial in the case. Trial on the government’s suit seeking to shut down the defendants with a permanent injunction is scheduled to begin on May 20, 2013, in Dayton.
	
According to the government complaint in the case, ITS franchisees routinely prepare and file fraudulent federal tax returns, fabricate deductions and invent phony businesses. The suit further alleges that ITS franchisees file tax returns without customer authorization and without proper employer-issued W-2 wage statements, and charge customers exorbitant and bogus fees. Defendants and their franchisees allegedly lure mostly low-income customers into ITS stores by offering deceptive and misleading loans such as “Instant Cash” or “Holiday” loans, often before the tax return filing season begins. Defendants have denied the allegations in the complaint.

A federal court in Indianapolis permanently barred David Franklin and his company, Instant Refund Tax Service (IRTS), from preparing tax returns and from operating a tax-preparation business, the Justice Department announced today.  The government alleged that IRTS, which Franklin wholly owns, operated as a franchisee of Instant Tax Service, a large national tax-preparation franchisor operated by ITS Financial LLC, based in Dayton, Ohio.  The order follows an earlier preliminary injunction against the defendants. In a separate case, a federal court in Ohio preliminarily enjoined the Dayton-based franchisor last November.  The defendants in both cases consented to entry of the preliminary injunctions without admitting the allegations against them.

References 

https://www.justice.gov/opa/pr/owner-nationwide-tax-return-preparation-franchisor-convicted-conspiracy-evading-employment

External links 
Instant Tax Service
[www.greattaxllc.com Instant Tax Service/Great Tax Service LLC.]
 http://banktalk.org/content/instant-tax-dodge-doj-order

Defunct companies based in Dayton, Ohio
Defunct financial services companies of the United States